The Old World babblers or Timaliidae are a family of mostly Old World passerine birds. They are rather diverse in size and coloration, but are characterised by soft fluffy plumage. These are birds of tropical areas, with the greatest variety in Southeast Asia and the Indian subcontinent.   The timaliids are one of two unrelated groups of birds known as babblers, the other being the Australasian babblers of the family Pomatostomidae (also known as pseudo-babblers).

Morphological diversity is rather high; most species resemble "warblers", jays or thrushes. This group is among those Old World bird families with the highest number of species still being discovered.

Characteristics

Timaliids are small to medium birds. They have strong legs, and many are quite terrestrial. They typically have generalised bills, similar to those of a thrush or warbler, except for the scimitar babblers which, as their name implies, have strongly decurved bills. Most have predominantly brown plumage, with minimal difference between the sexes, but many more brightly coloured species also exist.

This group is not strongly migratory, and most species have short rounded wings, and a weak flight. They live in lightly wooded or scrubland environments, ranging from swamp to near-desert. They are primarily insectivorous, although many will also take berries, and the larger species will even eat small lizards and other vertebrates.

Typical babblers live in communities of around a dozen birds, jointly defending a territory. Many even breed communally, with a dominant pair building a nest, and the remainder helping to defend and rear their young. Young males remain with the group, while females move away to find a new group, and thus avoid inbreeding. They make nests from twigs, and hide them in dense vegetation.

Taxonomy and systematics
The systematics of Old World babblers have long been contested. During much of the 20th century, the family was used as a "wastebin taxon" for numerous hard-to-place Old World songbirds (such as Picathartidae and Pnoepygidae, as well as the New World species the wrentit). The German ornithologist Ernst Hartert summarized this attitude with the statement that, in the passerines: "Was man nicht unterbringen kann, sieht man als Timalien an." (What one can't place systematically is considered an Old World babbler).

The most obviously misplaced taxa were removed piecemeal towards the end of the last century. Since then, with the aid of DNA sequence data, it has been confirmed that even the remaining group is not monophyletic. Analysis of mtDNA cytochrome b and 12S/16S rRNA data (Cibois 2003a) spread the Timaliidae that were studied across what essentially was a badly resolved polytomy with Old World warblers and white-eyes. As the typical warblers (genus Sylvia) grouped with some presumed timaliids (such as the fulvettas), it was suggested that some Sylviidae should be moved to the Timaliidae.

The phylogenetic relationships between Timaliidae and other families was determined in a molecular phylogenetic study by Tianlong Cai and collaborators that was published in 2019. It is shown in the cladogram below:

The cladogram below shows the relationships between the genera. These were determined in the same study by Cai and collaborators.

List of genera
The family as currently constituted includes 58 species divided into the following ten genera:

References

External links

Babbler videos on the Internet Bird Collection

 
.
Taxa named by Nicholas Aylward Vigors